is a Japanese voice actor and singer. He is affiliated with I'm Enterprise and Lantis. He is the former lead vocalist of Oldcodex, in which he performed under his stage name Ta_2.

Personal Life
Shūkan Bunshun reported that Suzuki was engaged to LiSA in May 2019. In January 2020, the two publicly revealed their relationship and announced they had married.

On August 4, 2021, Suzuki went on hiatus due to poor health issues, following a report published on July 30 by Shūkan Bunshun alleging that he was involved in an extramarital affair with a female work associate. The same report also alleged that Suzuki had possibly violated non-disclosure agreements during the affair regarding music he and Oldcodex had been working on for other anime series. On August 30, 2021, Suzuki released a statement apologizing for his "careless behavior." As a result of the hiatus, he withdrew from Ultraman. He was also recast in Kikai Sentai Zenkaiger, the CD bonuses of the game adaptation of My Next Life as a Villainess: All Routes Lead to Doom!, Pokémon Journeys: The Series, Alchemy Stars, The Misfit of Demon King Academy and Tokyo Revengers. However, Kyoto Animation confirmed that they were not replacing him in Free!.

Filmography

Anime series
2003
Dear Boys (Tsutomu Ishii)
D.N.Angel (Masahiro Sekimoto)
Mermaid Melody Pichi Pichi Pitch (Third Tachi Brother)

2004
Aishiteruze Baby (Kazuhiro Tsuchiya)
Gakuen Alice (Male student B, Reo's subordinate D, Yokoi)
My-HiME (Male Student)
Pocket Monsters: Advanced Generation (Kent)
Saiyuki Gunlock (Castle Guard, Demon)

2005
Best Student Council (Male Student 2)
Bleach (Shinigami)
Cluster Edge (No. 1)
Hell Girl (Delivery Man)
Loveless (Boy, Male Student, Natsumi's Father)
Rozen Maiden (Baseball Player, Flower, Male Student)
Shakugan no Shana (Vine)
Shuffle! (Lottery Clerk)
Solty Rei (Andy Anderson)
Tide-Line Blue (Deputy Teshio)

2006
Gaiking: Legend of Daiku-Maryu (Dick Alcain)
Gin-iro no Olynssis (Akira)
Gintama (Masashi)
Hell Girl: Two Mirrors (Youhei)
Kasimasi: Girl Meets Girl (Yanamoto)
Lovedol ~Lovely Idol~ (Yuuji Nishizawa)
The Familiar of Zero (Customer, Perisson)
xxxHOLiC (Man)
Wan Wan Serebu Soreyuke! Tetsunoshin (Rinia)

2007
Digimon Data Squad (Magnamon)
Jūsō Kikō Dancouga Nova (Sakuya Kamon)
Kamichama Karin (Jin Kuga)
Nodame Cantabile (Youhei Hashimoto)

2008
A Certain Magical Index (Ao Amai)
Black Butler (Viscount Druitt)
Library War (Hikaru Tezuka)
Pocket Monsters: Diamond & Pearl (Jun)
Wangan Midnight (Maki Kamiya)

2009
Heaven's Lost Property (Eishirō Sugata)
Miracle Train (Fuku Nishi-Shinjuku-Gochome)
Shikabane Hime: Kuro (Hizuchi)

2010
Baka and Test: Summon the Beasts (Yuji Sakamoto)
Black Butler II (Viscount Druitt)
Heaven's Lost Property Forte (Eishirō Sugata)
Omamori Himari (Taizō Masaki)
Tono to Issho (Date Masamune)

2011
Beyblade: Metal Fury (Chris)
Baka and Test: Summon the Beasts 2 (Yūji Sakamoto)
Bakugan Battle Brawlers: Gundalian Invaders (Linus)
Blood-C (Shinichirō Tokizane)
Mashiroiro Symphony (Hayata Mukunashi)
Sket Dance (Shinpei Takemitsu)
Tono to Issho: Gantai no Yabō (Masamune Date)

2012
Arashi no Yoru ni: Himitsu no Tomodachi (Tapu)
My Little Monster (Haru Yoshida)
Kuroko's Basketball (Kazunari Takao)
Saint Seiya Omega (Wolf Haruto)

2013
A Certain Scientific Railgun S (Ao Amai)
Arata Kangatari (Akachi)
Beyond the Boundary (Hiroomi Nase)
Detective Conan (Takurou Yoda)
Free! (Makoto Tachibana)
Inazuma Eleven GO Galaxy (Munemasa Ibuki, Bark Separk, Jinsuke Manabe, Maxim Adrov, Sevan Basha, Song Ji-Hun)
Kuroko's Basketball Season 2 (Kazunari Takao)
Maoyū Maō Yūsha (Soldier Apprentice)
Servant × Service (Yutaka Hasebe)
Uta no Prince-sama - Maji Love 2000% (Ranmaru Kurosaki)

2014
Ace of Diamond (Yuuta Mishima)
Bakumatsu Rock (Shinsaku Takasugi)
Brynhildr in the Darkness (Kurofuku)
Free! Eternal Summer (Makoto Tachibana)
HappinessCharge PreCure! (Kenta Yamazaki)
Hozuki no Reitetsu (Haru, Inch-High Samurai)
Invaders of the Rokujyōma!? (Kenji Matsudaira)
Monthly Girls' Nozaki-kun (Oze/Male Student) 
Nobunagun (Jack the Ripper/Adam Muirhead)
Orenchi no Furo Jijō (Takasu)
The Seven Deadly Sins (Ban)

2015
 Dance with Devils (Roen)
Diabolik Lovers More, Blood (Yuma Mukami)
Fafner in the Azure: Exodus (Mitsugu Jinnai)
Ghost in the Shell: Arise Alternative Architecture (Akira Hose)
Kuroko's Basketball Season 3 (Kazunari Takao)
Pocket Monsters: XY&Z (Ippei)
Q Transformers: Kaettekita Convoy no Nazo (Lockdown)
Q Transformers Season 2 (Lockdown)
Seraph of the End (Shinya Hiragi)
Seraph of the End: Battle in Nagoya (Shinya Hiragi)
The Perfect Insider (Yukihiro Yamane)
Uta no Prince-sama Revolutions (Ranmaru Kurosaki)

2016
Dagashi Kashi (Tō Endō)
Fudanshi Kōkō Seikatsu (Yūjirō Shiratori)
Prince of Stride: Alternative (Tasuku Senoo)
Scared Rider Xechs (Yosuke Christoph Komae)
Servamp (Tsubaki)
Tsukiuta. THE ANIMATION (Mikaduki Yuzuru)
Uta no Prince-sama Maji Love Legend Star (Season 4) (Ranmaru Kurosaki)

2017
Akashic Records of Bastard Magic Instructor (Jatice Lowfan)
Blend S (Kōyō Akizuki)
ēlDLIVE (Laine Brick)
Nana Maru San Batsu (Takumi Niina)

2018
Bakumatsu (Yoshinobu Tokugawa)
Butlers: Chitose Momotose Monogatari (Kouma Jinguuji)
Dagashi Kashi 2 (Tō Endō)
Free!: Dive to The Future (Makoto Tachibana)
JoJo's Bizarre Adventure: Golden Wind (Prosciutto)
Island (Setsuna Sanzenkai)
Magical Girl Site (Kiichirō Misumi)
Magical Girl Ore (Magical Girl Everything Crazy Beauty)
Megalobox (Mikio Shirato)
My Sweet Tyrant (Atsuhiro Kagari)
Record of Grancrest War (Ion)
The Seven Deadly Sins: Revival of the Commandments (Ban)

2019
Attack on Titan Season 3 Part 2 (Grice)
Namu Amida Butsu!: Rendai Utena (Ashura)
To the Abandoned Sacred Beasts (Roy (Garm))
Kengan Ashura (Ohma Tokita / Ashura)
The Ones Within (Hikaru Genji)
Bakumatsu Crisis (Yoshinobu Tokugawa)
Special 7: Special Crime Investigation Unit (Kujaku "Analyzer" Nijō)
African Office Worker (Honey Badger)
The Seven Deadly Sins: Wrath of the Gods (Ban)
Assassins Pride (William Jin)
Blade of the Immortal -Immortal- (Taito Magatsu)

2020
Somali and the Forest Spirit (Yabashira)
My Next Life as a Villainess: All Routes Lead to Doom! (Alan Stuart)
The Misfit of Demon King Academy (Anos Voldigoad)
Pocket Monsters 2019 (Raihan (episode 27 - 45))
Moriarty the Patriot (Blitz Enders)
The God of High School (Axley Ivanovic)

2021
Black Clover (Zenon Zogratis)
The Seven Deadly Sins: Dragon's Judgement (Ban)
Those Snow White Notes (Rai Nagamori)
Burning Kabaddi (Kyōhei Misumi)
Megalobox 2: Nomad (Mikio Shirato)
Tokyo Revengers (Ken "Draken" Ryūgūji)
Welcome to Demon School! Iruma-kun Season 2 (Ronove Lomiere)
Shaman King (Ryo Sugimoto)
My Next Life as a Villainess: All Routes Lead to Doom! X (Alan Stuart)
Tesla Note (Kuruma)

2022
VazzRock the Animation (Yuzuru Mikazuki)

2023
Nier: Automata Ver1.1a (Eve)

Original video animation / Original net animation 
Saint Beast : Ikusen no Hiru to Yoru Hen (2005-2006) (Pearl)
Sin in the Rain (Suspect)
Master of Martial Hearts (2008-2009) (Hiroki Honma)
Tenchi Muyo! War on Geminar (2009-2010) (Ulyte)
Tono to Issho (Date Masamune)
Heaven's Lost Property (2010) (Eishiro Sugata)
Baka to Test to Shōkanjū: Matsuri (2011) (Yuji Sakamoto)
Tight-rope (2013) (Ryunosuke Ohara)
My Little Monster (2013) (Yoshida Haru)
Kick-Heart (2013) (Romeo Maki/Masked Man M)
Alice in Borderland (2014) (Daikichi Karube)
Diabolik Lovers (2015) (Yuma Mukami)
Free! Eternal Summer (2015) (Makoto Tachibana)
The Seven Deadly Sins (2015) (Ban)
Brotherhood: Final Fantasy XV (2016) (Noctis Lucis Caelum)
Bōkyaku Battery (2020) (Aoi Tōdō)
Record of Ragnarok (2021-2023) (Shiva)
Ultraman - Season 2 (2022) (Kotaro Higashi / Ultraman Taro) - Replace by Tomoaki Maeno

Anime films
Majime Fumajime Kaiketsu Zorori Nazono Takara Taisakusen (2006) (Nyanga)
Keroro Gunsō the Super Movie (2006) (Yamada-sensei)
Inazuma Eleven: Saikyō Gundan Ōga Shūrai (2010) (Eska Bammel)
Heaven's Lost Property the Movie: The Angeloid of Clockwork (2011) (Eishiro Sugata)
Towa no Quon (2011) (Ryou)
Ghost in the Shell: Arise (2014) (Akira Hose)
High Speed! Free! Starting Days (2015) (Makoto Tachibana)
Kingsglaive: Final Fantasy XV (2016) (Noctis Lucis Caelum)
Black Butler: Book of the Atlantic (2017) (Viscount Druitt)
Kuroko's Basketball The Movie: Last Game (2017) (Kazunari Takao)
Free! Timeless Medley: The Bond (2017) (Makoto Tachibana)
Free! Timeless Medley: The Promise (2017) (Makoto Tachibana)
Free! Take Your Marks (2017) (Makoto Tachibana)
The Seven Deadly Sins the Movie: Prisoners of the Sky (2018) (Ban)
Seven Days War (2019) (Sōma Ogata)
Altered Carbon: Resleeved (2020) (Takeshi Kovacs)
The Seven Deadly Sins: Cursed by Light (2021) (Ban)
Free!–the Final Stroke– Zenpen (2021) (Makoto Tachibana)
Free!–the Final Stroke– Kouhen (2022) (Makoto Tachibana)

Video games
13 Sentinels: Aegis Rim (Shu Amiguchi, Tetsuya Ida)
Arknights (Aosta)
Bakumatsu Rock (Shinsaku Takasugi)
Birdie Crush (Kris Lowell)
Breath of Fire 6 (Protagonist (Male))
Call of Duty: Modern Warfare 3 (Sandman)
Da Capo: Girl's Symphony (Ryohei Shinomiya)
Datenshi no Amai Yuuwaku x Kaikan Phrase (Sakuya Okochi)
Dear Boys Fast Break!  (Tsutomu Ishii)
Diabolik Lovers series (Yuma Mukami)
Disgaea 4: A Promise Unforgotten (Valvatorez)
Disgaea D2: A Brighter Darkness (Valvatorez)
Dissidia Final Fantasy NT (Noctis Lucis Caelum)
Dissidia Final Fantasy Opera Omnia (Noctis Lucis Caelum)
Fatal Frame: Maiden of Black Water (Hōjō Ren)
Fate/Grand Order (Ashwatthama)
Final Fantasy XIV: A Realm Reborn (Aymeric)
Final Fantasy XIV: Heavensward (Aymeric)
Final Fantasy XV (Noctis Lucis Caelum)
Fire Emblem: Radiant Dawn (Ranulf, Tibarn)
Fire Emblem Echoes: Shadows of Valentia (Berkut)
Fire Emblem Heroes (Alfonse)
Food Fantasy (2018) – Bamboo Rice
Granblue Fantasy (Aglovale, Helnar)
Gundam Breaker 3 (Will)
Gunslinger Stratos 3 (Argo Odhner)
Heaven's Lost Property (Eishiro Sugata)
Itadaki Street: Dragon Quest and Final Fantasy 30th Anniversary (Noctis Lucis Caelum)
JoJo's Bizarre Adventure: All Star Battle (Ghiaccio)
JoJo's Bizarre Adventure: All Star Battle R (Prosciutto)
JoJo's Bizarre Adventure: Eyes of Heaven (Ghiaccio)
Kaikan Phrase CLIMAX -Next Generation- (Reon Okochi)
Nier: Automata (Eve)
 Onmyōji (Minamoto no Hiromasa)
Palais de Reine (Winfried)
Palais de Royale (Winfried)
Sdorica (Jerome Muca, Jerome SP)
Shakugan no Shana (Ryūgan)
Shinobi, Koi Utsutsu (Anayama Daisuke)
Soul Cradle Sekai wo Kurau Mono (Levin, Rasukyuran)
Super Robot Wars series (Sakuya Kamon)
Sword Art Online: Fatal Bullet (Itsuki)
Tales of Crestoria (Aegis Alver)
Tales of Fandom Vol.2 (Larry Hughes)
Tekken 7 (Noctis Lucis Caelum)
The King of Fighters All Star (Ban)
The Seven Deadly Sins: Grand Cross (Ban)
Uta no Prince-sama series (Ranmaru Kurosaki)
World of Final Fantasy Maxima (Noctis Lucis Caelum)
Zero: Nuregarasu no Miko (Ren Hōjō)
Zero Escape: The Nonary Games (Junpei)
Zero Escape: Zero Time Dilemma (Junpei)
Kamen Rider: Memory of Heroez- Eiji Hino/Kamen Rider OOO

Drama CDs
Twinkle Stars (2010) (Saki)
A Devil and Her Love Song (????) (Kanda Yuusuke)
Akaiito (2015) (Touya Nanjou)
Diabolik Lovers series (2012-) (Yuma Mukami)
Utsukushii koto (????) (Matsuoka Yousuke)
Itoshii koto (????) (Matsuoka Yousuke)
Watashi ga Motete Dōsunda (2015) (Nozomu Nanashima)
Mo Dao Zu Shi/Ma Dou So Shi (2020) (Wei Wuxian/Gi Musen)

Live-action films
Library Wars: The Last Mission (2015)

Tokusatsu
 Tokumei Sentai Go-Busters (2012 - 2013) - Usada Lettuce
 Kamen Rider × Super Sentai: Super Hero Taisen (2012) - Usada Lettuce, Shinji Kido/Kamen Rider Ryuki, Kai Ozu/Magi Red
 Tokumei Sentai Go-Busters the Movie: Protect the Tokyo Enetower! (2012) - Usada Lettuce
 Tokumei Sentai Go-Busters vs. Kaizoku Sentai Gokaiger: The Movie  (2013) - Usada Lettuce
 Kamen Rider × Super Sentai × Space Sheriff: Super Hero Taisen Z (2013) - Usada Lettuce
 Tokumei Sentai Go-Busters Returns vs. Dōbutsu Sentai Go-Busters (2013) - Usada Lettuce
 Ultraman Ginga S The Movie (2015) - Etelgar
 Kikai Sentai Zenkaiger (2021) - Gege (1 - 21)

Dubbing roles

Live-action
24: Legacy (Eric Carter (Corey Hawkins))
Breach (Noah (Cody Kearsley))
Divergent (Tobias "Four" Eaton (Theo James))
The Divergent Series: Insurgent (Tobias "Four" Eaton (Theo James))
The Divergent Series: Allegiant (Tobias "Four" Eaton (Theo James))
Escape Room (Jason Walker (Jay Ellis))
The Falcon and the Winter Soldier (John Walker / Captain America / U.S. Agent (Wyatt Russell))
Flatliners (Jamie (James Norton))
Free Solo (Alex Honnold)
Genius (Eduard Einstein (Eugene Simon))
Lessons of a Dream (Konrad Koch (Daniel Brühl))
Magadheera (Kala Bhairava / Harsha (Ram Charan))
Master (Park Jang-goon (Kim Woo-bin))
Miss Bala (Lino Esparza (Ismael Cruz Córdova))
Mortal Kombat (Cole Young (Lewis Tan))
The Mummy (Malik (Marwan Kenzari))
Power Rangers (Zack Taylor/Black Ranger (Ludi Lin))
Running Wild with Bear Grylls (Alex Honnold)
Scary Stories to Tell in the Dark (Ramón Morales (Michael Garza))
Star Trek: Picard (Narek (Harry Treadaway))

Animation
Captain Underpants: The First Epic Movie (George Beard)
The Dark Crystal: Age of Resistance (Rian)
Mao Mao: Heroes of Pure Heart (Mao Mao)
Peter Rabbit (Johnny Town-Mouse)
Peter Rabbit 2: The Runaway (Johnny Town-Mouse)
Scoob! (Shaggy)

References

External links
Official agency profile 
Oldcodex official website 
Oldcodex official MySpace page
Tatsuhisa Suzuki  at GamePlaza-Haruka Voice Acting Database 
Tatsuhisa Suzuki at Hitoshi Doi's Seiyuu Database

1983 births
Living people
I'm Enterprise voice actors
Japanese male pop singers
Japanese male rock singers
Japanese male video game actors
Japanese male voice actors
Lantis (company) artists
People from Ichikawa, Chiba
People from Okazaki, Aichi
21st-century Japanese male actors
21st-century Japanese male singers
21st-century Japanese singers